Przemysław Stępień (born 7 February 1994) is a Polish professional volleyball player. At the professional club level, he plays for ZAKSA Kędzierzyn-Koźle.

Honours

Clubs
 National championships
 2014/2015  Polish Cup, with Trefl Gdańsk
 2015/2016  Polish SuperCup, with Trefl Gdańsk
 2018/2019  Polish Cup, with ZAKSA Kędzierzyn-Koźle
 2018/2019  Polish Championship, with ZAKSA Kędzierzyn-Koźle
 2019/2020  Polish SuperCup, with ZAKSA Kędzierzyn-Koźle
 2022/2023  Polish Cup, with ZAKSA Kędzierzyn-Koźle

References

External links

 
 Player profile at PlusLiga.pl
 Player profile at Volleybox.net

1994 births
Living people
People from Iława
Sportspeople from Warmian-Masurian Voivodeship
Polish men's volleyball players
Trefl Gdańsk players
Effector Kielce players
ZAKSA Kędzierzyn-Koźle players
AZS Olsztyn players
Cuprum Lubin players
Setters (volleyball)